ATP-binding cassette sub-family A member 12 also known as ATP-binding cassette transporter 12 is a protein that in humans is encoded by the ABCA12 gene.

ABCA12 belongs to a group of genes called the ATP-binding cassette family, which makes proteins that transport molecules across cell membranes. The ABCA12 gene is active in some types of skin cells and in several other tissues, such as testis, placenta, lung, stomach, and fetal brain and liver. This protein appears to be essential for normal development of the skin, which provides a barrier between the body and its surrounding environment.  It transports epidermoside, a glucosylceramide, out of the keratinocytes of the stratum corneum of the epidermis.

The ABCA12 gene is located on the long (q) arm of chromosome 2 between positions 34 and 35, from base pair 215,621,772 to base pair 215,828,656.

Clinical significance

Harlequin-type ichthyosis 
Several mutations in the ABCA12 gene are known to cause harlequin-type ichthyosis. Most of these mutations are predicted to lead to an absence of ABCA12 protein or the production of an extremely small version of the protein that cannot transport lipids properly. A loss of functional ABCA12 protein causes numerous problems with the development of the epidermis before and after birth. Abnormalities in lipid transport prevent the skin from forming an effective barrier and result in the hard, thick scales characteristic of harlequin ichthyosis.

Lamellar ichthyosis type 2 
Mutations in the ABCA12 gene also cause another severe skin disorder, lamellar ichthyosis type 2. People with this disorder have red, scaly, plate-like skin covering most of their bodies. The ABCA12 mutations that cause this disorder substitute one amino acid (a building block of proteins) for another amino acid in the ABCA12 protein. These mutations almost always occur in an important functional region of the protein (the region that binds to ATP, a molecule that supplies energy for chemical reactions). Changes in the structure of the ABCA12 protein likely disrupt its ability to transport lipids, which affects the development of skin before and after birth.

References

Further reading

 *

External links 
 GeneCard
 
         
 

ATP-binding cassette transporters